St. Mary's Children's Hospital, which was founded in 1870, was described in 2020 as "As New York City’s only post-acute pediatric care facility." In 1951 it moved from its Manhattan location to Queens. Despite its name, its has specialized programs for teens and also for seniors. During the 2020 Coronavirus period, due to parts of their facility being
"regulated as an adult nursing home," many of their programs closed March 2020 through May 2021.

History
They began as "a small, 15-bed hospital in Hell’s Kitchen" in 1870.

The hospital's parent's name is St. Mary's Healthcare System for Children, and their programs include
"to provide children with special healthcare needs."

References

  

History of Queens, New York
Hospitals in Queens, New York
Children's hospitals in New York (state)